The 1979–80 season was the 78th season in which Dundee competed at a Scottish national level, playing in the Premier Division after getting promoted the previous season. Once again however, the club would find themselves relegated at the end of the season. Dundee would also compete in both the Scottish League Cup and the Scottish Cup, where they would be eliminated by Hamilton Academical in the quarter-finals of the League Cup, and by Dundee United in the 3rd round of the Scottish Cup. They would also compete in the Anglo-Scottish Cup, being eliminated by English side Sheffield United in the quarter-finals.

Scottish Premier Division 

Statistics provided by Dee Archive.

League table

Scottish League Cup 

Statistics provided by Dee Archive.

Scottish Cup 

Statistics provided by Dee Archive.

Anglo-Scottish Cup 

Statistics provided by Dee Archive.

Player statistics 
Statistics provided by Dee Archive

|}

See also 

 List of Dundee F.C. seasons

References

External links 

 1979-80 Dundee season on Fitbastats

Dundee F.C. seasons
Dundee